Louisiana's 37th State Senate district is one of 39 districts in the Louisiana State Senate. It has been represented by Republican Barrow Peacock since 2012.

Geography
District 37 is evenly split between Bossier and Caddo Parishes in Ark-La-Tex, including parts of southern Shreveport and Bossier City.

The district is located entirely within Louisiana's 4th congressional district, and overlaps with the 2nd, 5th, 6th, 8th, and 9th districts of the Louisiana House of Representatives.

Recent election results
Louisiana uses a jungle primary system. If no candidate receives 50% in the first round of voting, when all candidates appear on the same ballot regardless of party, the top-two finishers advance to a runoff election.

2019

2015

2011

Federal and statewide results in District 37

References

Louisiana State Senate districts
Bossier Parish, Louisiana
Caddo Parish, Louisiana